"Soundcheck" is the eighth single by Welsh indie rock band Catfish and the Bottlemen. The song was the lead single from their sophomore album, The Ride. The single was digitally released on 16 February 2016.

Track listing
The CD version of the single was for promotional use only and contained two versions of the song: the radio and studio edits.

Charts

Certifications

References

External links
Soundcheck - Catfish and the Bottlemen at Discogs

2016 singles
2016 songs
Catfish and the Bottlemen songs
Song recordings produced by Dave Sardy